Zemel is a surname. Notable people with the surname include:

Eitan Zemel, American academic
Dvora Bochman (born 1950 as Dvora Rivka Zemel), Israeli artist, painter, and sculptor
Louis Zemel, plaintiff in Zemel v. Rusk

Jewish surnames